John Joseph Keane (September 12, 1839 – June 22, 1918) was an Irish-born American prelate of the Roman Catholic Church.  He served as the archbishop of the Archdiocese of Dubuque in Iowa from 1900 to 1911.  He previously served as bishop of the Diocese of Richmond in Virginia from 1878 to 1888.

Keane was a founder of the Catholic University of America in Washington, D.C., serving as its first rector from 1886 to 1896.

Biography

Early life 
Keane was born on September 12, 1839, in Ballyshannon, County Donegal, Ireland, to Hugh and Fannnie (Connolly) Keane. He was one of five children, and the family immigrated to the United States when he was seven years old. He was educated at Saint Charles College in Ellicott City, Maryland, and at Saint Mary's Seminary in Baltimore, Maryland.

Priesthood 
On July 2, 1866, Keane was ordained a priest for the Archdiocese of Baltimore by Archbishop Martin Spalding.  After his ordination, Keane was appointed curate of St. Patrick's Parish in Washington, D.C., where he spent 12 years. He helped form both the Catholic Total Abstinence Union of America and the Catholic Young Men's National Union in 1872, and the Carroll Society in 1873. He also established the Tabernacle Society in Washington that worked with poor parishes throughout the country.

Bishop of Richmond 
On March 28, 1878, Pope Leo XIII appointed Keane as the fifth bishop of the Diocese of Richmond at age 38. He was consecrated on August 25, 1878, by Archbishop James Gibbons.  Bishops John Joseph Kain and Thomas Foley were the principal co-consecrators.

As bishop, Keane established the Confraternity of the Holy Ghost, a Catholic fellowship, in the diocese. He published A Sodality Manual for the Use of the Servants of the Holy Ghost in 1880. Despite opposition, Keane founded schools and churches for Catholic African-Americans in the diocese. He addressed Protestant groups to educate them about the Catholic Church.

In 1884, Keane attended the Third Plenary Council of Baltimore in Baltimore, Maryland. The Council appointed him in May 1885 to the committee for the founding of a Catholic university in the United States.

Catholic University of America 
Keane was appointed as the first rector of the Catholic University of America in 1886.  He continued to serve as bishop of Richmond until August 12, 1888, when he resigned that post and was named titular bishop of Iasus.

Keane soon gained a reputation as an administrator and an orator who was widely quoted in the press. At the same time he became aligned with the more progressive wing of the Catholic hierarchy. He advocated for the Knights of Labor and took part in the Cahenslyism controversy He promoted the quick Americanization of immigrants, the full representation of the Catholic Church at the Parliament of the World's Religions in Chicago and his positions on the school question. His democratic and liberal policies made him enemies with conservatives in the hierarchy and at the Vatican.  In 1896, Keane was forced to resign as rector of the university.

Rome 
On January 29, 1897 Pope Leo XIII named Keane as the titular archbishop of Damascus. He travelled to Rome, spending the years 1897 to 1899 as canon of the Basilica of St. John Lateran, assistant at the pontifical throne, and counsellor to the Congregation for the Propagation of the Faith. He lived in two rooms at the Pontifical Canadian College.

Keane was attacked during the Americanism controversy "as a rationalist, throwing all dogma over to modern ideas." He fought these attacks to maintain his name. In 1899, Keane was relieved of his responsibilities in Rome and was tasked to raise funds for the Catholic University of America, which was facing financial difficulties.

Archbishop of Dubuque 
On July 24, 1900 Pope Leo XIII appointed Keane as the second archbishop of the Diocese Dubuque. As archbishop, he took a prominent part in the Catholic Young Men's National Union and in the Total Abstinence Union of North America, and lectured widely on temperance, education and American institutions. He encouraged postgraduate courses and ongoing education for priests, and doubled the faculty and buildings of St. Joseph's College in Dubuque.  Keane established 12 academies for girls and two for boys in the archdiocese.

On January 15, 1902, the pope erected the Diocese of Sioux City  from the western half of the archdiocese. Keane's friend and associate at Catholic University, the Rev. Philip Joseph Garrigan, was appointed Sioux City's first bishop. The current boundaries of the archdiocese would not be established until 1911 after Keane's resignation.

Retirement 
As his health declined, Keane petitioned Pope Pius X  for the appointment of an auxiliary or a coadjutor bishop. However, Pius declined to make an appointment.  Keane then submitted his resignation as archbishop of Dubuque, which the pope accepted on April 28, 1911.  He was named titular archbishop of Cius at the same time.  Keane was succeeded by Bishop James John Keane. The two bishops were unrelated.  Some locals drew comparisons between the two men;. John Keane was called "Sugar" due to his kind and generous nature and James Keane was nicknamed "Hickory" due to his stern personality.

After his retirement, John Keane resided in the cathedral rectory in Dubuque.  He died on June 12, 1918 in Dubuque.  He was buried at Mount Olivet Cemetery in Key West, Iowa.

A selection from Keane's writings and addresses was edited by Maurice Francis Egan under the title Onward and Upward: A Year Book (Baltimore, 1902).  In 1939, Loras Hall at Loras College was renamed Keane Hall in honor of John and James Keane.

References

Sources
Ahern, Patrick Henry, The Life of John J. Keane: Educator and Archbishop, 1839–1918. Bruce Publishing Company, Milwaukee (1955)
Ahern, Patrick Henry, The Catholic University of America: the Rectorship of John J. Keane. The Catholic University of America Press, Washington, D.C. (1948)
Biography in "Historic Images of the Catholic Universities of America"

1839 births
1918 deaths
Roman Catholic bishops of Richmond
American Roman Catholic clergy of Irish descent
Irish emigrants to the United States (before 1923)
St. Charles College alumni
St. Mary's Seminary and University alumni
Harvard University staff
Presidents of the Catholic University of America
19th-century Roman Catholic bishops in the United States
20th-century Roman Catholic archbishops in the United States
Roman Catholic archbishops of Dubuque
People from Ballyshannon
People from Washington, D.C.
Burials in Iowa